Michelle Strinden is an American politician serving as a member of the North Dakota House of Representatives from the 41st district. Elected in November 2018, she assumed office on December 1, 2018.

Early life and education 
Strinden was born in Grand Forks, North Dakota. She earned a Bachelor of Science degree in secondary education from the University of North Dakota in 1991 and a Master of Science in counseling from Minnesota State University Moorhead in 1995.

Career 
Strinden worked as a school counselor in the West Fargo Public Schools. She was elected to the North Dakota House of Representatives in November 2018 and assumed office on December 1, 2018. Strinden is an advocate for school choice.

References 

Living people
People from Grand Forks, North Dakota
University of North Dakota alumni
Minnesota State University Moorhead alumni
Republican Party members of the North Dakota House of Representatives
Women state legislators in North Dakota
21st-century American politicians
21st-century American women politicians
Year of birth missing (living people)